Qabil Street (Arabic: شارع قابل) also known as Souq Qabil (Arabic: سوق قابل) is a market street in Jeddah, Saudi Arabia. It is one of Jeddah's oldest markets, located in the heart of the city's historic centre, Al Balad.

The market is on a narrow street with historic buildings and old-style restaurants and shops that sell goods, ranging from spices and household needs to perfumes and jewellery. It is marked as "Qabel Trail" on Google Maps.

History
Qabil Street was founded by Hussein bin Ali in the early years of the 20th century. It was not given its name until it was bought in 1925–6 by Suliman Qabil, who was one of the most popular merchants in the city at the time.

Qabil Street was home to currency exchange shops. It was also specialized in imported textiles, shoes, watches, etc., as well as locally manufactured goods. The street was the first to be electrified in the city.

Route
The street leads from King Abdulaziz Road, close to Al Mahmal Center in Al Balad to Al Dhahab Street. It is 77 meters long and seven meters wide.

Heading east towards Al Ma’amar Mosque, there are historic buildings like Nassif House Museum and Matbouli House Museum, among the best-preserved examples of old Jeddah architecture.

Qabil Street during Ramadan
The Historic Jeddah festival is annually held in Al Balad to celebrate the culture and heritage of Jeddah usually during the month of Ramadan and Eid. Qabil Street becomes particularly active with entertainment and activities being held, including seasonal food stalls, street hawkers, music, and plays by artists dressed in traditional Saudi outfits representing the local folklore.

See also
 Nassif House Museum
 Al Balad
 King Saud Mosque
 Jeddah
 List of shopping malls in Saudi Arabia
 Tourism in Saudi Arabia

References



Souqs
Shopping districts and streets
Tourist attractions in Jeddah
Geography of Jeddah